Robert Lee Harrison (born September 22, 1930) is a retired American professional baseball player, a right-handed pitcher who had two one-game end-of-season trials in Major League Baseball for the Baltimore Orioles in  and . He was born in St. Louis, Missouri.

In 1955, after a 14–12 win–loss record in the Class A Western League, Harrison was called to Baltimore when the rosters expanded in September. He relieved starting pitcher Eddie Lopat in the fifth inning of the second game of a twinight doubleheader on September 23 at Griffith Stadium against the Washington Senators. Harrison hurled two innings and surrendered four bases on balls, two hits and two earned runs in a 7–3 Oriole defeat.

The following season, Harrison won 10 games and lost 12 in a year split between the Double-A Texas League and the Open-Classification Pacific Coast League. Recalled by the Orioles again, he started on September 26, 1956, at Memorial Stadium against the eventual world champion New York Yankees. He lasted only 1⅔ innings, giving up three earned runs, three hits and five walks. However, Harrison was not charged with the 11–6 Baltimore defeat, as Hal Brown, who relieved him in the second inning, gave up the winning run. Altogether Harrison appeared in two MLB games, pitched in 3⅔ innings, and gave up five earned runs, six hits, and five bases on balls. He did not record a strikeout. His eight-year pro career concluded after the 1958 season.

References

External links
Major League statistics from Baseball Reference
Minor league statistics from Baseball Reference

1930 births
Living people
Baltimore Orioles players
Baseball players from St. Louis
Major League Baseball pitchers
Wichita Indians players